The Toughest Gun in Tombstone is a 1958 American Western film directed by Earl Bellamy and starring George Montgomery.

Opening narration
"In the early eighteen-eighties, when all law enforcement failed in Arizona Territory, cattle rustling, robbery and murder began a notorious reign. As law agencies became disorganized, crime organized and grew powerful under the leadership of three of the West's most vicious outlaws — Johnny Ringo, Ike Clanton and Curly Bill Brocious. The situation became so bad that President Chester A. Arthur, on April the twenty-sixth, eighteen eighty two, authorized the governor of Arizona Territory to resort to any means he saw fit to crush the rule of the outlaws. The last desperate battle against the murderous gangs of the West was to begin in a very strange way — in a remote stretch of country just outside the town of Phoenix."

Plot
Before initiating an undercover investigation in Tombstone, Arizona, Captain Matt Sloane (George Montgomery) sets out to build a reputation for himself as a ruthless man. Sloane distributes "wanted" circulars describing his supposed criminal exploits, drops off his young son, Terry (Scotty Morrow), with a friend and joins a vicious gang headed up by his target, reckless outlaw, Johnny Ringo (Jim Davis). As Sloane works his way into Ringo's inner circle, Terry goes home in search of his father.

Closing narration
"The outlaw empire of Arizona Territory had been broken. And, in this new and decent land, Captain Matt Sloane found his home."

Cast

George Montgomery as Matt Sloane
Jim Davis as Ringo
Beverly Tyler as Della
Gerald Milton as Clanton
Don Beddoe as Cooper
Scotty Morrow as Terry
Harry Lauter as Barger
Charles Wagenheim as Beasley
Lane Bradford as Bill
Rodolfo Hoyos as Colonel

See also
 List of American films of 1958

References

External links

1958 films
1950s English-language films
American black-and-white films
American Western (genre) films
1958 Western (genre) films
Films directed by Earl Bellamy
Films produced by Edward Small
Films scored by Paul Dunlap
United Artists films
1950s American films